Luciano Zornetta (born ) is an Argentine volleyball player. He is part of the Argentina men's national volleyball team. At club level he plays for Boca Rio Uruguay Seg.

References

External links
 profile at FIVB.org

1993 births
Living people
Argentine men's volleyball players
Place of birth missing (living people)
Volleyball players at the 2015 Pan American Games
Pan American Games medalists in volleyball
Pan American Games gold medalists for Argentina
Medalists at the 2015 Pan American Games